Kim Song-chol (born 29 August 1983) is a North Korean former footballer. He represented North Korea on at least eight occasions between 2005 and 2008.

Career statistics

Club

International

References

1983 births
Living people
North Korean footballers
North Korea international footballers
Association football defenders
China League One players
Yanbian Funde F.C. players
North Korean expatriate footballers
North Korean expatriate sportspeople in China
Expatriate footballers in China